Season seven of Seinfeld, an American comedy television series created by Jerry Seinfeld and Larry David, began airing on September 21, 1995, and concluded on May 16, 1996, on NBC. It is the final season before Larry David left.

Production
Seinfeld was produced by Castle Rock Entertainment and distributed by Columbia Pictures Television and Columbia TriStar Television (now Sony Pictures Television) and was aired of NBC in the US. The executive producers were Larry David, George Shapiro, and Howard West with Tom Gammill and Max Pross as supervising producers. Bruce Kirschbaum was the executive consultant. This season was directed by Andy Ackerman.

The series was set predominantly in an apartment block on New York City's Upper West Side. The seventh season was shot and mostly filmed in CBS Studio Center in Studio City, California. The show features Jerry Seinfeld as himself, and a host of Jerry's friends and acquaintances, which include George Costanza, Elaine Benes, and Cosmo Kramer, portrayed by Jason Alexander, Julia Louis-Dreyfus and Michael Richards, respectively.

Episodes

Reception 
The review aggregator website Rotten Tomatoes reported a 100% approval rating with an average rating of 9.3/10, based on 8 critic reviews.

Honors
TV Guide named it the 41st greatest television season of all time. It was one of four Seinfeld seasons on the list.

References

External links

 
 
 

7
1995 American television seasons
1996 American television seasons